Battle Clash, known in Japan as , is a light gun shooter video game developed by TEC and published by Nintendo for the Super Nintendo Entertainment System in 1992. The game supports the Super Scope. It was followed by Metal Combat: Falcon's Revenge the following year.

Gameplay

In the game, the player is the gunner of the mecha ST Falcon and also Mike's partner, who fights against a group of other STs in one-on-one battles. To attack, the player must shoot using the Super Scope. It is possible to shoot rapid shots by holding down the fire button, as well as energy bolts (charged shots).  Energy bolts can be shot when an energy bar fills up (this happens when the player does not fire).  When the energy bar has filled up, the energy bolt can be fired, though it will consume the energy bar.  It is also important to defend against enemy attacks by shooting their fire. Some attacks can only be deflected by firing energy bolts.

The objective of the game is to defeat the rival ST to clear the stage. The damage inflicted on the enemy depends on the spot where the ST has been shot (all STs have some kind of weak point) and how powerful the shot is. The player wins if the rival ST's energy is depleted first. If the enemy depletes the player's energy or if the stage is played for ten minutes, then the game is over, but it is possible to continue the game indefinitely.

Synopsis
In a distant future, Earth lives in chaos and the only order that rules reside in is the "Battle Game", where the winner takes control over the world. All battles are fought with mechs called "Standing Tanks" (ST). A merciless fighter called Anubis eventually becomes the champion of the Battle Game.

Mike Anderson, whose father was one of the many victims of Anubis, refuses to succumb, and trains himself in everything ST-related to stop the current chaos and avenge his father's death. To accomplish this, he must first defeat the Battle Chiefs (Anubis' subordinates).

Development and release
The Japanese version, Space Bazooka, was released a year later after its initial release in North America. The Japanese version features slightly different endings from the western version of the game. If the player completes the game on the Normal difficulty setting, the background during the closing credits will be decorated with an image of the main character Mike Anderson standing besides the Falcon (in contrast to the blank blue background used in the western version). If the player completes the game on the Hard difficulty setting, Mike will be joined by Tasha, Antonov, and Eddie (the characters who assist Mike and the player during the final battle) as well.

Reception

Notes

References

External links
 Official Nintendo web page (Original)
 Official Intelligent Systems website (Original)

1992 video games
Light gun games
Intelligent Systems games
Nintendo Research & Development 1 games
Super Nintendo Entertainment System games
Super Nintendo Entertainment System-only games
Post-apocalyptic video games
Video games developed in Japan
Video games set in New York City
Video games set in South America
Nintendo games
Video games about mecha
Multiplayer and single-player video games
Video games set in Egypt
Video games set in Japan
Video games set in London
Video games with alternate endings
Video games set on the Moon
Video games set in the 21st century
Video games set in Oceania
Video games set in Russia
Video games scored by Yuka Tsujiyoko